Epeius (Ancient Greek: Ἐπειός Epeiós) or Epeus was a mythological Greek soldier during the Trojan War or, in some accounts, one of the Achaean Leaders, at the head of a contingent of 30 ships from the islands of the Cyclades. He was also the architect of the Wooden Horse, by means of which the Achaeans took Troy; he was himself among those warriors who hid inside it.

Family 
Epeus was the son of Panopeus, son of Phocus and Asterodia.

Mythology 
Epeius had the reputation for being a giant, with enormous strength. In the Iliad he was victorious after participating in the boxing match against Euryalus at the funeral games in honour of Patroclus. Later during the funeral games for Achilles he fought Acamas, the son of Theseus, to a stalemate. He built the Trojan Horse, commissioned by Odysseus because Athena had told him in a dream she would be with him to help build it. The horse was hollow and was large enough to hold 30 Greek soldiers equipped with all their armor but Epeius made the Trojan horse so tall that it could not fit through any of the gates of Troy.  The trap door of the horse was fastened with a special catch that only Epeius could undo.  After constructing the massive horse, he chose the other 29 soldiers that would accompany him inside the horse. He also founded Pisa and Metapontum.

Notes

References 

 Apollodorus, The Library with an English Translation by Sir James George Frazer, F.B.A., F.R.S. in 2 Volumes, Cambridge, MA, Harvard University Press; London, William Heinemann Ltd. 1921. ISBN 0-674-99135-4. Online version at the Perseus Digital Library. Greek text available from the same website.
 Dictys Cretensis, from The Trojan War. The Chronicles of Dictys of Crete and Dares the Phrygian translated by Richard McIlwaine Frazer, Jr. (1931-). Indiana University Press. 1966. Online version at the Topos Text Project.
 Publius Vergilius Maro, Aeneid. Theodore C. Williams. trans. Boston. Houghton Mifflin Co. 1910. Online version at the Perseus Digital Library.
 Publius Vergilius Maro, Bucolics, Aeneid, and Georgics. J. B. Greenough. Boston. Ginn & Co. 1900. Latin text available at the Perseus Digital Library.
 Quintus Smyrnaeus, The Fall of Troy translated by Way. A. S. Loeb Classical Library Volume 19. London: William Heinemann, 1913. Online version at theio.com
 Quintus Smyrnaeus, The Fall of Troy. Arthur S. Way. London: William Heinemann; New York: G.P. Putnam's Sons. 1913. Greek text available at the Perseus Digital Library.

Achaean Leaders
Achaeans (Homer)
Phocian characters in Greek mythology